Douglas Noël Adams (11 March 1952 – 11 May 2001) was an English author and screenwriter, best known for The Hitchhiker's Guide to the Galaxy. Originally a 1978 BBC radio comedy, The Hitchhiker's Guide to the Galaxy developed into a "trilogy" of five books that sold more than 15 million copies in his lifetime. It was further developed into a television series, several stage plays, comics, a video game, and a 2005 feature film. Adams's contribution to UK radio is commemorated in The Radio Academy's Hall of Fame.

Adams also wrote Dirk Gently's Holistic Detective Agency (1987) and The Long Dark Tea-Time of the Soul (1988), and co-wrote The Meaning of Liff (1983), The Deeper Meaning of Liff (1990), and Last Chance to See (1990). He wrote two stories for the television series Doctor Who, co-wrote City of Death (1979), and served as script editor for its seventeenth season. He co-wrote the sketch "Patient Abuse" for the final episode of Monty Python's Flying Circus. A posthumous collection of his selected works, including the first publication of his final (unfinished) novel, was published as The Salmon of Doubt in 2002.

Adams was a self-proclaimed "radical atheist", an advocate for environmentalism and conservation, and a lover of fast cars, technological innovation and the Apple Macintosh.

Early life
Adams was born in Cambridge on 11 March 1952 to Christopher Douglas Adams (1927–1985), a management consultant and computer salesman, former probation officer and lecturer on probationary group therapy techniques, and nurse Janet (1927–2016), née Donovan. The family moved a few months after his birth to the East End of London, where his sister, Susan, was born three years later. His parents divorced in 1957; Douglas, Susan and their mother moved then to an RSPCA animal shelter in Brentwood, Essex, run by his maternal grandparents. Each remarried, giving Adams four half-siblings. A great-grandfather was the playwright Benjamin Franklin Wedekind.

Education
Adams attended Primrose Hill Primary School in Brentwood. At the age of nine, he passed the entrance exam for Brentwood School. He attended the prep school from 1959 to 1964, then the main school until December 1970. His form master, Frank Halford, said that Adams's height had made him stand out and that he had been self-conscious about it. His ability to write stories made him well known in the school. He became the only student ever to be awarded a ten out of ten by Halford for creative writing – something he remembered for the rest of his life, particularly when facing writer's block.

Some of his earliest writing was published at the school, such as a report on its photography club in The Brentwoodian in 1962, or spoof reviews in the school magazine Broadsheet, edited by Paul Neil Milne Johnstone, who later became a character in The Hitchhiker's Guide. He also designed the cover of one issue of the Broadsheet, and had a letter and short story published in The Eagle, the boys' comic, in 1965. A poem entitled "A Dissertation on the task of writing a poem on a candle and an account of some of the difficulties thereto pertaining" written by Adams in January 1970 at the age of 17, was discovered in a cupboard at the school in early 2014.

On the strength of an essay on religious poetry that discussed the Beatles and William Blake, he was awarded an Exhibition in English at St John's College, Cambridge (where his father had also been a student), going up in 1971. He wanted to join the Footlights, an invitation-only student comedy club that has acted as a hothouse for comic talent. He was not elected immediately as he had hoped, and started to write and perform in revues with Will Adams (no relation) and Martin Smith; they formed a group called "Adams-Smith-Adams". He became a member of the Footlights by 1973. Despite doing very little work – he recalled having completed three essays in three years – he graduated in 1974 with a 2:2 in English literature.

Career

Writing
After leaving university Adams moved back to London, determined to break into TV and radio as a writer. An edited version of the Footlights Revue appeared on BBC2 television in 1974. A version of the Revue performed live in London's West End led to Adams being discovered by Monty Python's Graham Chapman. The two formed a brief writing partnership, earning Adams a writing credit in episode 45 of Monty Python for a sketch called "Patient Abuse". The pair also co-wrote the "Marilyn Monroe" sketch which appeared on the soundtrack album of Monty Python and the Holy Grail. Adams is one of only two people other than the original Python members to get a writing credit (the other being Neil Innes).

Adams had two brief appearances in the fourth series of Monty Python's Flying Circus. At the beginning of episode 42, "The Light Entertainment War", Adams is in a surgeon's mask (as Dr. Emile Koning, according to on-screen captions), pulling on gloves, while Michael Palin narrates a sketch that introduces one person after another but never gets started. At the beginning of episode 44, "Mr. Neutron", Adams is dressed in a pepper-pot outfit and loads a missile onto a cart driven by Terry Jones, who is calling for scrap metal ("Any old iron..."). The two episodes were broadcast in November 1974. Adams and Chapman also attempted non-Python projects, including Out of the Trees.

At this point Adams's career stalled; his writing style was unsuited to the then-current style of radio and TV comedy. To make ends meet he took a series of odd jobs, including as a hospital porter, barn builder, and chicken shed cleaner. He was employed as a bodyguard by a Qatari family, who had made their fortune in oil.

During this time Adams continued to write and submit sketches, though few were accepted. In 1976 his career had a brief improvement when he wrote and performed Unpleasantness at Brodie's Close at the Edinburgh Fringe festival. By Christmas, work had dried up again, and a depressed Adams moved to live with his mother. The lack of writing work hit him hard and low confidence became a feature of Adams's life; "I have terrible periods of lack of confidence [...] I briefly did therapy, but after a while I realised it was like a farmer complaining about the weather. You can't fix the weather – you just have to get on with it".

Some of Adams's early radio work included sketches for The Burkiss Way in 1977 and The News Huddlines. He also wrote, again with Chapman, the 20 February 1977 episode of Doctor on the Go, a sequel to the Doctor in the House television comedy series. After the first radio series of The Hitchhiker's Guide became successful, Adams was made a BBC radio producer, working on Week Ending and a pantomime called Black Cinderella Two Goes East. He left after six months to become the script editor for Doctor Who.

In 1979, Adams and John Lloyd wrote scripts for two half-hour episodes of Doctor Snuggles: "The Remarkable Fidgety River" and "The Great Disappearing Mystery" (episodes eight and twelve). John Lloyd was also co-author of two episodes from the original Hitchhiker radio series ("Fit the Fifth" and "Fit the Sixth", also known as "Episode Five" and "Episode Six"), as well as The Meaning of Liff and The Deeper Meaning of Liff.

Work on Doctor Who

Adams sent the script for the HHGG pilot radio programme to the Doctor Who production office in 1978, and was commissioned to write The Pirate Planet. He had also previously attempted to submit a potential film script, called Doctor Who and the Krikkitmen, which later became his novel Life, the Universe and Everything (which in turn became the third Hitchhiker's Guide radio series). Adams then went on to serve as script editor on the show for its seventeenth season in 1979. Altogether, he wrote three Doctor Who serials starring Tom Baker as the Fourth Doctor:

 The Pirate Planet (the second serial in the Key to Time arc, in season 16)
 City of Death (with producer Graham Williams, from an original storyline by writer David Fisher. It was transmitted under the pseudonym "David Agnew")
 Shada (only partially filmed; not televised due to industry disputes, but was later completed using animation for the unfinished scenes and broadcast as "Doctor Who: The Lost Episode" on BBC America 19 July 2018)

The episodes authored by Adams are some of the few that were not originally novelised, as Adams would not allow anyone else to write them and asked for a higher price than the publishers were willing to pay. Shada was later adapted as a novel by Gareth Roberts in 2012 and City of Death and The Pirate Planet by James Goss in 2015 and 2017 respectively.

Elements of Shada and City of Death were reused in Adams's later novel Dirk Gently's Holistic Detective Agency, in particular, the character of Professor Chronotis. Big Finish Productions eventually remade Shada as an audio play starring Paul McGann as the Doctor. Accompanied by partially animated illustrations, it was webcast on the BBC website in 2003, and subsequently released as a two-CD set later that year. An omnibus edition of this version was broadcast on the digital radio station BBC7 on 10 December 2005.

In the Doctor Who 2012 Christmas episode "The Snowmen", writer Steven Moffat was inspired by a storyline that Adams pitched called The Doctor Retires.

The Hitchhiker's Guide to the Galaxy

The Hitchhiker's Guide to the Galaxy was a concept for a science-fiction comedy radio series pitched by Adams and radio producer Simon Brett to BBC Radio 4 in 1977. Adams came up with an outline for a pilot episode, as well as a few other stories (reprinted in Neil Gaiman's book Don't Panic: The Official Hitchhiker's Guide to the Galaxy Companion) that could be used in the series.

According to Adams, the idea for the title occurred to him while he lay drunk in a field in Innsbruck, Austria, gazing at the stars. He was carrying a copy of the Hitch-hiker's Guide to Europe, and it occurred to him that "somebody ought to write a Hitchhiker's Guide to the Galaxy".

Despite the original outline, Adams was said to make up the stories as he wrote. He turned to John Lloyd for help with the final two episodes of the first series. Lloyd contributed bits from an unpublished science fiction book of his own, called GiGax. Very little of Lloyd's material survived in later adaptations of Hitchhiker's, such as the novels and the TV series. The TV series was based on the first six radio episodes, and sections contributed by Lloyd were largely re-written.

BBC Radio 4 broadcast the first radio series weekly in the UK starting 8 March 1978, lasting until April. The series was distributed in the United States by National Public Radio. Following the success of the first series, another episode was recorded and broadcast, which was commonly known as the Christmas Episode. A second series of five episodes was broadcast one per night, during the week of 21–25 January 1980.

While working on the radio series (and with simultaneous projects such as The Pirate Planet) Adams developed problems keeping to writing deadlines that got worse as he published novels. Adams was never a prolific writer and usually had to be forced by others to do any writing. This included being locked in a hotel suite with his editor for three weeks to ensure that So Long, and Thanks for All the Fish was completed. He was quoted as saying, "I love deadlines. I love the whooshing noise they make as they go by." Despite the difficulty with deadlines, Adams wrote five novels in the series, published in 1979, 1980, 1982, 1984, and 1992.

The books formed the basis for other adaptations, such as three-part comic book adaptations for each of the first three books, an interactive text-adventure computer game, and a photo-illustrated edition, published in 1994. This latter edition featured a 42 Puzzle designed by Adams, which was later incorporated into paperback covers of the first four Hitchhiker's novels (the paperback for the fifth re-used the artwork from the hardback edition).

In 1980, Adams began attempts to turn the first Hitchhiker's novel into a film, making several trips to Los Angeles, and working with Hollywood studios and potential producers. The next year, the radio series became the basis for a BBC television mini-series broadcast in six parts. When he died in 2001 in California, he had been trying again to get the film project started with Disney, which had bought the rights in 1998. The screenplay got a posthumous re-write by Karey Kirkpatrick, and the resulting film was released in 2005.

Radio producer Dirk Maggs had consulted with Adams, first in 1993, and later in 1997 and 2000 about creating a third radio series, based on the third novel in the Hitchhiker's series. They also discussed the possibilities of radio adaptations of the final two novels in the five-book "trilogy". As with the film, this project was realised only after Adams's death. The third series, The Tertiary Phase, was broadcast on BBC Radio 4 in September 2004 and was subsequently released on audio CD. With the aid of a recording of his reading of Life, the Universe and Everything and editing, Adams can be heard playing the part of Agrajag posthumously. So Long, and Thanks for All the Fish and Mostly Harmless made up the fourth and fifth radio series, respectively (on radio they were titled The Quandary Phase and The Quintessential Phase) and these were broadcast in May and June 2005, and also subsequently released on Audio CD. The last episode in the last series (with a new, "more upbeat" ending) concluded with, "The very final episode of The Hitchhiker's Guide to the Galaxy by Douglas Adams is affectionately dedicated to its author."

Dirk Gently series

Between Adams's first trip to Madagascar with Mark Carwardine in 1985, and their series of travels that formed the basis for the radio series and non-fiction book Last Chance to See, Adams wrote two other novels with a new cast of characters. Dirk Gently's Holistic Detective Agency was published in 1987, and was described by its author as "a kind of ghost-horror-detective-time-travel-romantic-comedy-epic, mainly concerned with mud, music and quantum mechanics".

A sequel, The Long Dark Tea-Time of the Soul, was published a year later. This was an entirely original work, Adams's first since So Long, and Thanks for All the Fish. After the book tour, Adams set off on his round-the-world excursion which supplied him with the material for Last Chance to See.

The Salmon of Doubt was incomplete when published posthumously.

Music
Adams played the guitar left-handed and had a collection of twenty-four left-handed guitars when he died (having received his first guitar in 1964). He also studied piano in the 1960s. Pink Floyd and Procol Harum had important influence on Adams's work.

Pink Floyd
Adams's official biography shares its name with the song "Wish You Were Here" by Pink Floyd. The opening section of "Shine On You Crazy Diamond" was featured in a section of the third episode of the original 1978 Hitchhiker's Guide to the Galaxy radio series (broadcast only, cut from commercial releases). Adams was friends with Pink Floyd guitarist David Gilmour and, on Adams's 42nd birthday, he was invited to make a guest appearance at Pink Floyd's concert of 28 October 1994 at Earls Court in London, playing guitar on the songs "Brain Damage" and "Eclipse". Adams chose the name for Pink Floyd's 1994 album, The Division Bell, by picking the words from the lyrics to one of its tracks, "High Hopes". Pink Floyd and the song "Set the Controls for the Heart of the Sun" in particular, inspired Adams to create the rock band Disaster Area who appear in The Restaurant at the End of the Universe, who planned to crash a space ship into a nearby star as a stunt during a concert. Gilmour also performed at Adams's memorial service in 2001, and what would have been Adams's 60th birthday party in 2012.

Computer games and projects
Douglas Adams created an interactive fiction version of HHGG with Steve Meretzky from Infocom in 1984. In 1986 he participated in a week-long brainstorming session with the Lucasfilm Games team for the game Labyrinth. Later he was also involved in creating Bureaucracy as a parody of events in his own life.

Adams was a founder-director and Chief Fantasist of The Digital Village, a digital media and Internet company with which he created Starship Titanic, a Codie award-winning and BAFTA-nominated adventure game, which was published in 1998 by Simon & Schuster. Terry Jones wrote the accompanying book, entitled Douglas Adams' Starship Titanic, since Adams was too busy with the computer game to do both. In April 1999, Adams initiated the h2g2 collaborative writing project, an experimental attempt at making The Hitchhiker's Guide to the Galaxy a reality, and at harnessing the collective brainpower of the internet community. It was hosted by BBC Online from 2001 to 2011.

In 1990, Adams wrote and presented a television documentary programme Hyperland which featured Tom Baker as a "software agent" (similar to the assistant pictured in Apple's Knowledge Navigator video of future concepts from 1987), and interviews with Ted Nelson, the co-inventor of hypertext and the person who coined the term. Adams was an early adopter and advocate of hypertext.

Personal beliefs and activism

Atheism and views on religion
Adams described himself as a "radical atheist", adding "radical" for emphasis so he would not be asked if he meant agnostic. He told American Atheists that this conveyed the fact that he really meant it. He imagined a sentient puddle who wakes up one morning and thinks, "This is an interesting world I find myself in – an interesting hole I find myself in – fits me rather neatly, doesn't it? In fact it fits me staggeringly well, must have been made to have me in it!" to demonstrate his view that the fine-tuned universe argument for God was a fallacy.

He remained fascinated by religion because of its effect on human affairs. "I love to keep poking and prodding at it. I've thought about it so much over the years that that fascination is bound to spill over into my writing."

The evolutionary biologist and atheist Richard Dawkins invited Adams to participate in his 1991 Royal Institution Christmas Lectures, where Dawkins calls Adams from the audience to read a passage from The Restaurant at the End of the Universe which satirizes the absurdity of the thought that any one species would exist on Earth merely to serve as a meal to another species, such as humans. Dawkins also uses Adams's influence to exemplify arguments for non-belief in his 2006 book The God Delusion. Dawkins dedicated the book to Adams, whom he jokingly called "possibly [my] only convert" to atheism and wrote on his death that "Science has lost a friend, literature has lost a luminary, the mountain gorilla and the black rhino have lost a gallant defender."

Environmental activism
Adams was also an environmental activist who campaigned on behalf of endangered species. This activism included the production of the non-fiction radio series Last Chance to See, in which he and naturalist Mark Carwardine visited rare species such as the kakapo and baiji, and the publication of a tie-in book of the same name. In 1992, this was made into a CD-ROM combination of audiobook, e-book and picture slide show.

Adams and Mark Carwardine contributed the 'Meeting a Gorilla' passage from Last Chance to See to the book The Great Ape Project. This book, edited by Paola Cavalieri and Peter Singer, launched a wider-scale project in 1993, which calls for the extension of moral equality to include all great apes, human and non-human.

In 1994, he participated in a climb of Mount Kilimanjaro while wearing a rhino suit for the British charity organisation Save the Rhino International. Puppeteer William Todd-Jones, who had originally worn the suit in the London Marathon to raise money and bring awareness to the group, also participated in the climb wearing a rhino suit; Adams wore the suit while travelling to the mountain before the climb began. About £100,000 was raised through that event, benefiting schools in Kenya and a black rhinoceros preservation programme in Tanzania. Adams was also an active supporter of the Dian Fossey Gorilla Fund.

Since 2003, Save the Rhino has held an annual Douglas Adams Memorial Lecture around the time of his birthday to raise money for environmental campaigns.

Technology and innovation
Adams bought his first word processor in 1982, having considered one as early as 1979. His first purchase was a Nexu. In 1983, when he and Jane Belson went to Los Angeles, he bought a DEC Rainbow. Upon their return to England, Adams bought an Apricot, then a BBC Micro and a Tandy 1000. In Last Chance to See, Adams mentions his Cambridge Z88, which he had taken to Zaire on a quest to find the northern white rhinoceros.

Adams's posthumously published work, The Salmon of Doubt, features several articles by him on the subject of technology, including reprints of articles that originally ran in MacUser magazine, and in The Independent on Sunday newspaper. In these Adams claims that one of the first computers he ever saw was a Commodore PET, and that he had "adored" his Apple Macintosh ("or rather my family of however many Macintoshes it is that I've recklessly accumulated over the years") since he first saw one at Infocom's offices in Boston in 1984.

Adams was a Macintosh user from the time they first came out in 1984 until his death in 2001. He was the first person to buy a Mac in Europe, the second being Stephen Fry. Adams was also an "Apple Master", celebrities whom Apple made into spokespeople for its products (others included John Cleese and Gregory Hines). Adams's contributions included a rock video that he created using the first version of iMovie with footage featuring his daughter Polly. The video was available on Adams's .Mac homepage. Adams installed and started using the first release of Mac OS X in the weeks leading up to his death. His last post to his own forum was in praise of Mac OS X and the possibilities of its Cocoa programming framework. He said it was "awesome...", which was also the last word he wrote on his site.

Adams used email to correspond with Steve Meretzky in the early 1980s, during their collaboration on Infocom's version of The Hitchhiker's Guide to the Galaxy. While living in New Mexico in 1993 he set up another e-mail address and began posting to his own USENET newsgroup, alt.fan.douglas-adams, and occasionally, when his computer was acting up, to the comp.sys.mac hierarchy. Challenges to the authenticity of his messages later led Adams to set up a message forum on his own website to avoid the issue. In 1996, Adams was a keynote speaker at the Microsoft Professional Developers Conference (PDC) where he described the personal computer as being a modelling device. The video of his keynote speech is archived on Channel 9.
Adams was also a keynote speaker for the April 2001 Embedded Systems Conference in San Francisco, one of the major technical conferences on embedded system engineering.

Personal life
Adams moved to Upper Street, Islington, in 1981 and to Duncan Terrace, a few minutes' walk away, in the late 1980s.

In the early 1980s, Adams had an affair with novelist Sally Emerson, who was separated from her husband at that time. Adams later dedicated his book Life, the Universe and Everything to Emerson. In 1981 Emerson returned to her husband, Peter Stothard, a contemporary of Adams at Brentwood School, and later editor of The Times. Adams was soon introduced by friends to Jane Belson, with whom he later became romantically involved. Belson was the "lady barrister" mentioned in the jacket-flap biography printed in his books during the mid-1980s ("He [Adams] lives in Islington with a lady barrister and an Apple Macintosh"). The two lived in Los Angeles together during 1983 while Adams worked on an early screenplay adaptation of Hitchhiker's. When the deal fell through, they moved back to London, and after several separations ("He is currently not certain where he lives, or with whom") and a broken engagement, they married on 25 November 1991.

Adams and Belson had one daughter together, Polly Jane Rocket Adams, born on 22 June 1994, shortly after Adams turned 42. In 1999 the family moved from London to Santa Barbara, California, where they lived until his death. Following the funeral, Jane Belson and Polly Adams returned to London. Belson died on 7 September 2011 of cancer, aged 59.

Death and legacy 

Adams died of a heart attack due to undiagnosed coronary artery disease on 11 May 2001, aged 49, after resting from his regular workout at a private gym in Montecito, California. His funeral was held on 16 May in Santa Barbara. His ashes were placed in Highgate Cemetery in north London in June 2002. A memorial service was held on 17 September 2001 at St Martin-in-the-Fields church, Trafalgar Square, London. This became the first church service broadcast live on the web by the BBC.

Two days before Adams died, the Minor Planet Center announced the naming of asteroid 18610 Arthurdent. In 2005, the asteroid 25924 Douglasadams was named in his memory.

In May 2002, The Salmon of Doubt was published, containing many short stories, essays, and letters, as well as eulogies from Richard Dawkins, Stephen Fry (in the UK edition), Christopher Cerf (in the US edition), and Terry Jones (in the US paperback edition). It also includes eleven chapters of his unfinished novel, The Salmon of Doubt, which was originally intended to become a new Dirk Gently novel, but might have later become the sixth Hitchhiker novel.

Other events after Adams's death included a webcast production of Shada, allowing the complete story to be told, radio dramatisations of the final three books in the Hitchhiker's series, and the completion of the film adaptation of The Hitchhiker's Guide to the Galaxy. The film, released in 2005, posthumously credits Adams as a producer, and several design elements – including a head-shaped planet seen near the end of the film – incorporated Adams's features.

A 12-part radio series based on the Dirk Gently novels was announced in 2007.

BBC Radio 4 also commissioned a third Dirk Gently radio series based on the incomplete chapters of The Salmon of Doubt, and written by Kim Fuller; but this was dropped in favour of a BBC TV series based on the two completed novels. A sixth Hitchhiker novel, And Another Thing..., by Artemis Fowl author Eoin Colfer, was released on 12 October 2009 (the 30th anniversary of the first book), published with the support of Adams's estate. A BBC Radio 4 Book at Bedtime adaptation and an audio book soon followed.

On 25 May 2001, two weeks after Adams's death, his fans organised a tribute known as Towel Day, which has been observed every year since then.

An Apple Macintosh SE/30 once owned by Adams can be seen on display at The Centre for Computing History in Cambridge.

In 2018, John Lloyd presented an hour-long episode of the BBC Radio Four documentary Archive on 4, discussing Adams' private papers, which are held at St John's College, Cambridge. The episode is available online.

In March 2021 Unbound announced a crowdfunder for 42: the wildly improbable ideas of Douglas Adams, on the 20th anniversary of his death, a book based on Adams's papers, edited by Kevin Jon Davies.

The annual Douglas Adams Memorial Lectures began in 2003 and continue to this day.

Awards and nominations

Works

 The Private Life of Genghis Khan (1975), based on a comedy sketch Adams co-wrote with Graham Chapman (short story)
 The Hitchhiker's Guide to the Galaxy (1978) (radio series)
 The Pirate Planet (1978), a Doctor Who serial
 The Hitchhiker's Guide to the Galaxy (1979) (novel)
 City of Death (1979), a Doctor Who serial
 Shada (1979–1980), a Doctor Who serial
 The Restaurant at the End of the Universe (1980) (novel)
 A Liar's Autobiography (Volume VI) (1980) authored by Graham Chapman, with David Sherlock, Alex Martin, David A. Yallop and Adams
 Life, the Universe and Everything (1982) (novel)
 The Meaning of Liff (1983 (book), with John Lloyd)
 So Long, and Thanks for All the Fish (1984) (novel)
 The Hitchhiker's Guide to the Galaxy (1984, with Steve Meretzky) (computer game)
 The Hitchhiker's Guide to the Galaxy: The Original Radio Scripts (1985, with Geoffrey Perkins)
 Young Zaphod Plays It Safe (short story) (1986)
 A Christmas Fairly Story  (1986, with Terry Jones), and
 Supplement to The Meaning of Liff (1986, with John Lloyd and Stephen Fry), both part of
 The Utterly Utterly Merry Comic Relief Christmas Book (1986, edited with Peter Fincham)
 Bureaucracy (1987) (computer game)
 Dirk Gently's Holistic Detective Agency (1987) (novel)
 The Long Dark Tea-Time of the Soul (1988) (novel)
 The Deeper Meaning of Liff (1990, with John Lloyd)
 Last Chance to See (1990, with Mark Carwardine) (book)
 Mostly Harmless (1992) (novel)
 The Illustrated Hitchhiker's Guide to the Galaxy (1994)
 Douglas Adams's Starship Titanic: A Novel (1997), written by Terry Jones, based on an idea by Adams
 Starship Titanic (computer game) (1998)
 h2g2 (internet project) (1999)
 The Internet: The Last Battleground of the 20th century (radio series) (2000)
 The Hitchhiker's Guide to the Future (radio series) (2001) final project for BBC Radio 4 before his death
 Parrots, the universe and everything (2001)
 The Salmon of Doubt (2002), unfinished novel manuscript (11 chapters), short stories, essays, and interviews (also available as an audiobook, read by Simon Jones)
  The Hitchhiker's Guide to the Galaxy (2005) (film)

TV writing credits

See also
 List of animal rights advocates

Notes

References 
 Adams, Douglas (1998). Is there an Artificial God? , speech at Digital Biota 2, Cambridge, England, September 1998.
 
 Dawkins, Richard (2003). "Eulogy for Douglas Adams," in A devil's chaplain: reflections on hope, lies, science, and love. Houghton Mifflin Harcourt.
 Felch, Laura (2004). Don't Panic: Douglas Adams and the Hitchhiker's Guide to the Galaxy by Neil Gaiman , May 2004
 Ray, Mohit K (2007). Atlantic Companion to Literature in English, Atlantic Publishers and Distributors. 

 
 Webb, Nick (2005a). Wish You Were Here: The Official Biography of Douglas Adams. Ballantine Books. 
 Webb, Nick (2005b). "Adams, Douglas Noël (1952–2001)", Oxford Dictionary of National Biography, Oxford University Press, January 2005. Retrieved 25 October 2005.

Further reading

Articles

 Herbert, R. (1980). The Hitchhiker's Guide to the Galaxy (Book Review). Library Journal, 105(16), 1982.
 Adams, J., & Brown, R. (1981). The Hitchhiker's Guide to the Galaxy (Book Review). School Library Journal, 27(5), 74.
 Nickerson, S. L. (1982). The Restaurant at the End of the Universe (Book). Library Journal, 107(4), 476.
 Nickerson, S. L. (1982). Life, the Universe, and Everything (Book). Library Journal, 107(18), 2007.
 Morner, C. (1982). The Restaurant at the End of the Universe (Book Review). School Library Journal, 28(8), 87.
 Morner, C. (1983). Life, the Universe and Everything (Book Review). School Library Journal, 29(6), 93.
 Shorb, B. (1985). So Long, and Thanks for All the Fish (Book). School Library Journal, 31(6), 90.
 The Long Dark Tea-Time of the Soul (Book). (1989). Atlantic (02769077), 263(4), 99.
 Hoffert, B., & Quinn, J. (1990). Last Chance To See (Book). Library Journal, 115(16), 77.
 Reed, S. S., & Cook, I. I. (1991). Dances with kakapos. People, 35(19), 79.
 Last Chance to See (Book). (1991). Science News, 139(8), 126.
 Field, M. M., & Steinberg, S. S. (1991). Douglas Adams. Publishers Weekly, 238(6), 62.
 Dieter, W. (1991). Last Chance to See (Book). Smithsonian, 22(3), 140.
 Dykhuis, R. (1991). Last Chance To See (Book). Library Journal, 116(1), 140.
 Beatty, J. (1991). Good Show (Book). Atlantic (02769077), 267(3), 131.
 A guide to the future. (1992). Maclean's, 106(44), 51.
 Zinsser, J. (1993). Audio reviews: Fiction. Publishers Weekly, 240(9), 24.
 Taylor, B., & Annichiarico, M. (1993). Audio reviews. Library Journal, 118(2), 132.
 Good reads. (1995). NetGuide, 2(4), 109.
 Stone, B. (1998). The unsinkable starship. Newsweek, 131(15), 78.
 Gaslin, G. (2001). Galaxy Quest. Entertainment Weekly, (599), 79.
 So long, and thanks for all the fish. (2001). Economist, 359(8222), 79.
 Geier, T., & Raftery, B. M. (2001). Legacy. Entertainment Weekly, (597), 11.
 Passages. (2001). Maclean's, 114(21), 13.
 Don't panic! Douglas Adams to keynote Embedded show. (2001). Embedded Systems Programming, 14(3), 10.
 Ehrenman, G. (2001). World Wide Weird. InternetWeek, (862), 15.
 Zaleski, J. (2002). The Salmon of Doubt (Book). Publishers Weekly, 249(15), 43.
 Mort, J. (2002). The Salmon of Doubt (Book). Booklist, 98(16), 1386.
 Lewis, D. L. (2002). Last Time Round The Galaxy. Quadrant Magazine, 46(9), 84.
 Burns, A. (2002). The Salmon of Doubt (Book). Library Journal, 127(15), 111.
 Burns, A., & Rhodes, B. (2002). The Restaurant at the End of the Universe (Book). Library Journal, 127(19), 118.
 Kaveney, R. (2002). A cheerful whale. TLS, (5173), 23.
 Pearl, N., & Welch, R. (2003). The Hitchhiker's Guide To The Galaxy (Book). Library Journal, 128(11), 124.
 Preying on composite materials. (2003). R&D Magazine, 45(6), 44.
 Webb, N. (2003). The Berkeley Hotel hostage. Bookseller, (5069), 25.
 The author who toured the universe. (2003). Bookseller, (5060), 35.
 Osmond, A. (2005). Only human. Sight & Sound, 15(5), 12–15.
 Culture vulture. (2005). Times Educational Supplement, (4640), 19.
 Maughan, S. (2005). Audio Bestsellers/Fiction. Publishers Weekly, 252(30), 17.
 Hitchhiker At The Science Museum. (2005). In Britain, 14(10), 9.
 Rea, A. (2005). The Adams asteroids. New Scientist, 185(2488), 31.
 Most Improbable Adventure. (2005). Popular Mechanics, 182(5), 32.
 The Hitchhiker's Guide To The Galaxy: The Tertiary Phase. (2005). Publishers Weekly, 252(14), 21.
 Bartelt, K. R. (2005). Wish You Were Here: The Official Biography of Douglas Adams. Library Journal, 130(4), 86.
 Larsen, D. (2005). I was a teenage android. New Zealand Listener, 198(3390), 37–38.
 Tanner, J. C. (2005). Simplicity: it's hard. Telecom Asia, 16(6), 6.
 Nielsen Bookscan Charts. (2005). Bookseller, (5175), 18–21.
 Buena Vista launches regional site to push Hitchhiker's movie. (2005). New Media Age, 9.
 Shynola bring Beckland to life. (2005). Creative Review, 25(3), 24–26.
 Carwardine, M. (15 September 2007). The baiji: So long and thanks for all the fish. New Scientist. pp. 50–53.
 Czarniawska, B. (2008). Accounting and gender across times and places: An excursion into fiction. Accounting, Organizations & Society, 33(1), 33–47.
 Pope, M. (2008). Life, the Universe, Religion and Science. Issues, (82), 31–34.
 Bearne, S. (2008). BBC builds site to trail Last Chance To See TV series. New Media Age, 08.
 Arrow to reissue Adams. (2008). Bookseller, (5352), 14.
 Page, B. (2008). Colfer is new Hitchhiker. Bookseller, (5350), 7.
 I've got a perfect puzzle for you. (2009). Bookseller, (5404), 42.
 Mostly Harmless.... (2009). Bookseller, (5374), 46.
 Penguin and PanMac hitch a ride together. (2009). Bookseller, (5373), 6.
 Adams, Douglas. Britannica Biographies [serial online]. October 2010;:1
 Douglas (Noël) Adams (1952–2001). Hutchinson's Biography Database [serial online]. July 2011;:1
 My life in books. (2011). Times Educational Supplement, (4940), 27.

Other
 , established by him, and still operated by The Digital Village
 
 Douglas Adams speech at Digital Biota 2 (1998)  (The audio of the speech) 
 Guardian Books "Author Page", with profile and links to further articles.
 
 Douglas Adams & his Computer article about his Mac IIfx
 BBC2 "Omnibus" tribute to Adams, presented by Kirsty Wark, 4 August 2001
 Mueller, Rick and Greengrass, Joel (2002). Life, The Universe and Douglas Adams, documentary.
 Simpson, M.J. (2001). The Pocket Essential Hitchhiker's Guide. . Updated April 2005 
 Special edition of BBC Book Club featuring Douglas Adams, first broadcast 2 January 2000 on BBC Radio 4

External links

 
 
 
 Interview with Douglas Adams, A DISCUSSION WITH National Authors on Tour TV Series, Episode No. 33 (1992)

 
 

 
1952 births
2001 deaths
20th-century atheists
21st-century atheists
20th-century English novelists
21st-century English novelists
20th-century English screenwriters
Alumni of St John's College, Cambridge
Apple Inc. people
Audiobook narrators
BBC radio producers
British atheism activists
British child writers
British video game designers
Burials at Highgate Cemetery
English atheists
English comedy writers
English essayists
English humanists
English humorists
English radio writers
English science fiction writers
English social commentators
English television writers
Infocom
Inkpot Award winners
Interactive fiction writers
British male television writers
Monty Python
Non-fiction environmental writers
People educated at Brentwood School, Essex
People from Cambridge
Usenet people
Video game writers
Weird fiction writers